English band Sade have released six studio albums, one live album, two compilation albums, two extended plays, 23 singles, six video albums, 20 music videos, and have achieved four top 20 singles on the main chart of both the US and the UK. 

Following a brief stint of studying fashion design and modelling, Sade Adu began singing back up for a band named Pride. Later, she and some members left Pride and formed the band Sade in 1982. The name Sade represents the entire group, not just the singer herself. Following a record deal, Sade's debut album Diamond Life (1984) was released. At the time of release in 1984, the album sold over four million copies globally, and currently stands at six million copies globally.

Following the release of their debut album, Sade went on to release a string of multi-platinum-selling albums. Their follow-up, Promise, was released in 1985 and peaked at number one on the US Billboard 200 chart and the UK Albums Chart, and went two times platinum in the US at the time of its release, and now stands at four times platinum. Singer Sade would later go on to make her acting debut in the film Absolute Beginners, before the release of the band's next album, Stronger Than Pride (1988). Subsequent albums included Love Deluxe (1992) and Lovers Rock (2000), all of which went multi-platinum in the US. After the release of Lovers Rock the band embarked on what would be a 10-year hiatus. The band later reunited and released their sixth album, Soldier of Love (2010), which has been certified platinum in the US and won a Grammy Award.

Albums

Studio albums

Live albums

Compilation albums

Extended plays

Singles

Guest appearances

Videography

Video albums

Music videos

Notes

References

External links
 
 
 
 

Discographies of British artists
Rhythm and blues discographies
Discography
Soul music discographies
Vocal jazz discographies